John David Hubaldus Lehman (born in 1887 in Amstelveen) was a Dutch clergyman and bishop for the Roman Catholic Diocese of Rarotonga. He was appointed bishop in 1939. He died in 1967.

References 

1887 births
1967 deaths
Dutch Roman Catholic bishops
Roman Catholic bishops of Rarotonga